Ernestine Fu is an American venture capital investor and author.

Education 
Fu graduated with her B.S., M.S., MBA, and Ph.D. from Stanford University.

Career 
Fu started her investment career at Alsop Louie Partners in 2011. She closed her first deal in her first two months at the firm, and was recognized for bringing a fresh face to venture capital as a young Asian-American woman. Since then, she has been a venture partner at the firm.

She is frequently cited on the topic of autonomous vehicles, as she has made investments in early-stage technology companies like Zoox (now a subsidiary of Amazon) and nuTonomy (now part of the Motional autonomous driving joint venture between Aptiv and Hyundai Motor Group). She completed her doctoral thesis on autonomous vehicles at Stanford University’s Volkswagen Automotive Innovation Lab, and her research has been published at academic conferences such as the ACM Conference on Human Factors in Computing Systems. She has been a director at Hyundai Motor Group.

Fu has been an advisor to DBS Bank. She helped launch the bank’s venture debt program for financing startups and was the face of DBS BusinessClass, a program to foster entrepreneurship in Asia.

Fu is a faculty member at Stanford University. As an adjunct professor, she teaches courses on the effects of emerging technology on society.

Publications 

 Civic Work, Civic Lessons with former Stanford Law School Dean Thomas Ehrlich. 
 Renewed Energy with John Weyant and Justin Bowersock.

Recognition 
Forbes named her to its inaugural 30 Under 30 list; Vanity Fair named her to its Next Establishment list; and Business Insider named her to its Silicon Valley 100 list. Prior to including her on its 30 Under 30 list, Forbes featured her on the cover of its print magazine in the United States. She received the Kauffman Fellowship for venture capitalists and Eisenhower Fellowship for mid-career professionals.

She is also a Mensan.

References

Living people
American venture capitalists
American women investors
Stanford University alumni
American people of Chinese descent
Year of birth missing (living people)
Place of birth missing (living people)
Mensans
21st-century American non-fiction writers
American business writers
21st-century American businesswomen
21st-century American businesspeople